Steffen Kocholl (born 10 May 1983 in Öhringen) is a German former footballer.

References

1983 births
Living people
People from Öhringen
Sportspeople from Stuttgart (region)
German footballers
VfB Stuttgart players
VfB Stuttgart II players
SSV Reutlingen 05 players
SC Preußen Münster players
Bundesliga players
Association football defenders
Footballers from Baden-Württemberg